Mustafa Özbilgin may refer to:

 Mustafa F. Özbilgin, Turkish sociologist
 Mustafa Yücel Özbilgin, Turkish supreme court magistrate